Bills Creek is a stream in Iron and Reynolds counties in the U.S. state of Missouri. It is a tributary of the West Fork of the Black River and is located in the Mark Twain National Forest.

The stream flows generally to the southwest into Reynolds County and continues on to the south for approximately seven miles to its confluence with the West Fork about 1.5 miles west of the community of West Fork.

Bills Creek has the name of Bill Messer, a pioneer citizen.

See also
List of rivers of Missouri

References

Rivers of Iron County, Missouri
Rivers of Reynolds County, Missouri
Rivers of Missouri
Tributaries of the Black River (Arkansas–Missouri)